Coleophora tornata is a moth of the family Coleophoridae. It is found in southern Russia and central Asia. It occurs in desert-steppe and desert biotopes.

Adults are on wing from end of May to June.

The larvae feed on Kochia prostrata. They feed on the generative organs of their host plant.

References

tornata
Moths of Asia
Moths described in 1989